Poughkeepsie station is a Metro-North Railroad and Amtrak stop serving the city of Poughkeepsie, New York. The station is the northern terminus of Metro-North's Hudson Line, and an intermediate stop for Amtrak's several Empire Corridor trains.

Built in 1918, the main station building is meant to be a much smaller version of Grand Central Terminal. It was a source of civic pride when it opened. In 1976 it was added to the National Register of Historic Places as Poughkeepsie Railroad Station; it and Philipse Manor are the only Hudson Line stations outside Manhattan to be so recognized.

Station layout

The station is a four-story building built into a rockface, with the bottom two levels given over to the tracks and the top two accounted for by the main waiting room, a two-story brick-faced building. Its five-bay facade features sculptured masonry designs over the five high arched windows. To the west, a 420x15-foot (128x5 m) steel-frame overhead walkway provides access to the tracks via stairs and elevators. Today it continues westward to provide access to the adjacent parking garage. At the time of the station's construction, it served the businesses along Main Street.

The waiting room, modeled on Grand Central Terminal, is a high gallery lit during daylight by the windows and the three original chandeliers. The 14 benches within are also original finished chestnut pieces. The walls are paneled in wood to eight feet (240 cm), after which the carved stone shows all the way to the cornice. More original woodwork, the stained walnut rafters, is present in the ceiling, possibly modeled after a similar design in San Miniato al Monte, an 11th-century church in Florence, Italy.

Amenities include bathrooms (also modernized), a concession stand, as well as a ticket counter selling Metro-North tickets alongside two vending machines which also sell MetroCards; Amtrak tickets are available only by Quik-Trak machine. The northernmost MTA Police substation is adjacent to the station as well. In the late 1960s the North-South Arterial (US 9) was built and elevated immediately to the station's east, somewhat isolating it from the rest of the city.

There are four tracks at the platform level, enough to accommodate Amtrak and Metro-North stops simultaneously, and from west to east numbered 2, 1, 3, and 5. Only tracks 2, 1, and 3 are regularly used. Track 5, the easternmost, has a lower speed limit and is used mainly for non-revenue maintenance trains or those experiencing difficulties. The station has a high-level island platform, high level side platform, and a low level side platform, each six cars long and slightly offset from each other. Only the high level platforms are used in passenger service.

History

The first Poughkeepsie station was built in 1850 as what became the New York Central Railroad's Water Level Route worked its way up the Hudson River. For its first two years it was the end of the line, but even after it was completed all the way to Albany, it remained the most important intermediate stop. Many local industries, particularly the carpet mills and shoe factories in the city, used the rail facilities to get their products to market. The concentration of industry around a major rail stop also led to the rise of banking and finance within the city as well.

In 1888, with the completion of the nearby Poughkeepsie Railroad Bridge providing east-west rail service across the Hudson, Poughkeepsie became even more important to regional rail transportation. When it came time for a third station to be built on the site, the firm of Warren & Wetmore was hired to design a station that would impress travelers and communicate the city's confidence and cosmopolitan aspirations. They chose to model it on Grand Central, another successful design of theirs.

After five years of design and construction, the station was opened on February 18, 1918. The city's main newspaper, then the Poughkeepsie Eagle (now the Poughkeepsie Journal) was unstinting in its praise:

The building has remained largely intact since then, despite declines in passenger rail use and the demise of the New York Central. It has since transitioned, under the auspices of the Metropolitan Transportation Authority, from being a station for primarily intercity rail to the commuter services of Metro-North. It was added to the National Register of Historic Places in 1976. Until April 4, 2009, the southbound Lake Shore Limited (Train 48) stopped at the station, as well as at Hudson, and Rhinecliff-Kingston stations. On November 8, 2010, Lake Shore Limited service to the station was restored in both directions, and later at Rhinecliff-Kingston, but not at Hudson.

A massive restoration in the late 20th century included the reconstruction of the overpass from the station to Main Street and a large parking garage to serve commuters (many of whom come from points north and west). Since the 1990s, there have been rumors and plans to expand the Hudson Line north to Rhinecliff (or even further to Rensselaer). Local property owners have objected to the given plans to build stations in Hyde Park and Staatsburg though those who do commute via Poughkeepsie are in favor of the plan.

Bibliography

References

External links 

Metro-North Railroad stations in New York (state)
Former New York Central Railroad stations
Amtrak stations in New York (state)
U.S. Route 9
Buildings and structures in Poughkeepsie, New York
Railway stations in Dutchess County, New York
Railway stations on the National Register of Historic Places in New York (state)
Railway stations in the United States opened in 1850
Warren and Wetmore buildings
1850 establishments in New York (state)
National Register of Historic Places in Poughkeepsie, New York